Willow Springs may refer to:

Places
 Willow Springs, Arizona
Several places in California:
 Willow Springs, Kern County, California
 Willow Springs, Mono County, California
 Willow Springs, Riverside County, California
 Willow Springs, Tuolumne County, California
 Willow Springs International Motorsports Park
 Willow Springs, Illinois, United States
 Willow Springs, a historic name for the location of Beloit, Kansas, United States
 Willow Springs Township, Douglas County, Kansas, United States
 Willow Springs, Missouri, United States
 Several places in Texas:
 Willow Springs, Fayette County
 Willow Springs, Harris County
 Willow Springs, Rains County
 Willow Springs, San Jacinto County
 Willow Springs, Van Zandt County
 Willow Springs, Wisconsin, United States
An alternate name for Willow Spring, North Carolina (Wake County), United States

Other
Willow Springs, a literary journal published at Eastern Washington University
Willow Springs (1973 film)
Willow Springs Distilling Company in Omaha, Nebraska, United States
Willow Springs Water Park in Little Rock, Arkansas, United States